Tabios is a surname. Notable people with the surname include:

Eileen Tabios (born 1960), Filipino-American poet, fiction writer, conceptual/visual artist, editor, anthologist, critic, and publisher
Gerald Tabios (born 1969), Filipino long-distance runner and Ultramarathon runner

See also
Tobias